Le Jouet criminel is a French short crime film from 1969. It was directed and written by Adolfo Arrieta, starring Jean Marais and Michèle Moretti.

Cast 
 Jean Marais: the oldtimer
 Michèle Moretti: the running woman
 Xavier Grandès: the angel
 Florence Delay: the housewife
 Philippe Bruneau: the housewife's husband

References

External links 
 

1969 films
Spanish crime films
French crime films
French short films
1960s French-language films
1960s crime films
1960s French films
Spanish short films